The Saint Helena cuckoo (Nannococcyx psix) is an extinct bird. It was confirmed to have previously existed by a single humerus. Compared to other cuckoos, it was relatively small, and it probably lived in forests on the island of Saint Helena. Its extinction was a result of deforestation on the island in the 18th century.

References

BirdLife Species Factsheet.

Saint Helena cuckoo
†
Extinct birds of Atlantic islands
Bird extinctions since 1500
Saint Helena cuckoo
Saint Helena cuckoo